The Perfect Man (Hungarian: Tökéletes férfi) is a 1939 Hungarian comedy film directed by Sándor Szlatinay and starring Pál Jávor, Erzsi Simor and Tivadar Bilicsi.

Main cast

References

Bibliography
 Bujor Rîpeanu. Hungary (from the beginnings to 1988). Walter de Gruyter, 1989.

External links

1939 films
Hungarian comedy films
1930s Hungarian-language films
1939 comedy films
Hungarian black-and-white films